Horseshoe Cienega Lake is a lake in the White Mountains of eastern Arizona. It is the one of the area's most popular fishing lakes due to its productivity and convenience to the main highway State Route 260. The lake is in Apache County. As the lake is on the Fort Apache Indian Reservation, permits must be acquired in nearby Hon-Dah for all activities at the lake including fishing, camping and hiking.

Location 
The main parking area and boat launch are about a mile (1.6 km) south of State Route 260, and are accessed by a well-maintained dirt road. Unlike many of the high-altitude White Mountain lakes, Horseshoe Cienega Lake is accessible year-round. Ice fishing is possible when the lake freezes over, typically from late-November until mid-April.

Description 
The lake was created by damming Horseshoe Creek in the early 1960s. The lake was briefly drained in the winter of 1990–91. The forest surrounding the south shore of the lake contains around 70 primitive campsites with numerous pit toilets, picnic tables and potable water faucets. A convenience store that sold permits, groceries, bait and rental boats was consistently open from Memorial Day to Labor Day as recently as the 1990s; the store now appears to open only sporadically, and it is unclear whether it has been abandoned altogether. The lake also once held the distinction of having produced the state record brown trout of 16 pounds, 7 ounces and nearly 30 inches long; this record was broken in 1999 by a brown trout caught in Reservation Lake.

Fish species 

 Rainbow trout
 Brook trout
 Apache trout
 Brown trout

References 

Reservoirs in Apache County, Arizona
1960s establishments in Arizona